The Australian Literary Review (ALR) was a monthly supplement to The Australian newspaper established in September 2006 and published on the first Wednesday of each month. The headquarters was in Surry Hills, New South Wales. It was considered to be a continuation of The Australian's Review of Books, which was a supplement published between 1996 and 2001. The magazine's editors-in-chief included Stephen Matchett, Stephen Romei, and Luke Slattery. Like its predecessor, it was supported by the Australia Council for the Arts. The last issue was published in October 2011.

References

External links
  and 
 Australian Literary Review, Trove

2006 establishments in Australia
2011 disestablishments in Australia
Defunct literary magazines published in Australia
Magazines established in 2006
Magazines disestablished in 2011
Magazines published in Sydney
Monthly magazines published in Australia
News Corp Australia
Newspaper supplements